Made in Germany 1995–2011 was a concert tour by German band Rammstein in support of the compilation album of the same name. The tour consists of two European legs in late 2011 and early 2012, one North American leg in mid-2012, and a final European leg in mid-2013 which mostly consisted of festivals and other open air shows. This tour marked the first time the band played in Ireland.

Set lists

Note: "Sehnsucht" was not performed in Zagreb, on November 8, 2011.

Note:  For the first three shows of the tour in Bratislava, Zagreb, and Budapest, "Pussy" was played after "Mann gegen Mann". "Wollt ihr das Bett in Flammen sehen?" and "Amerika" were switched around. "Engel" was played right before  "Ich will" which ended the show. "Ohne dich" was played right before "Engel".

Note:  For the shows in Prague, and Gdańsk, "Engel" was played after "Pussy" which ended the show. "Wollt ihr das Bett in Flammen sehen?" and "Amerika" were switched around.

Note: In Munich they played "Bayern, des samma mia" after "Pussy".

Note:  For the shows in Moscow, "Moskau" was played after "Pussy" which ended the show.

Note:  In Helsinki, "Mein Herz brennt" featured Apocalyptica.

Note:  The supporting band for the first and second leg of Europe was the band Deathstars.

Note:  For the shows in Paris on March 6 and 7, "Frühling in Paris" was played after "Pussy" which ended the show. These shows were recorded for the film Rammstein: Paris.

Note:  For the North American tour, Montreal, Quebec and Vancouver were the only dates that played "Bück dich" in its traditional way. Because of sensitivity reasons in the United States, an alternate performance was done where Christian Lorenz would break a fake light over Till Lindemann's back and then Till shoots water from his mask.

Note:  The supporting act for the band during the North America leg of the tour was Joe Letz of Combichrist with a DJ set and large screen video.

Note:  For the show at Denver, "Children Medieval Band" opened the show with "Ich will" and "Sonne".

Note:  During the first few shows of the 2013 leg of the tour, the band played the rehearsal setlist in place of the regular one.

Note:  This tour denotes the first time Rammstein played in Ireland.

Tour dates

References 

Rammstein concert tours
2011 concert tours
2012 concert tours
2013 concert tours